This is a list of members of the Tasmanian Legislative Council between 1909 and 1915. Terms of the Legislative Council did not coincide with Legislative Assembly elections, and members served six year terms, with a number of members facing election each year.

Elections

Members

Notes
  On 15 February 1909, Thomas Fisher, the member for Huon, died. Stafford Bird won the resulting by-election on 4 May 1909.
  On 11 January 1910, Christopher O'Reilly, the member for South Esk, died. Arthur Loone won the resulting by-election on 3 May 1910.
  On 15 July 1914, Dr Gamaliel Butler, one of the three members for Hobart, died. Thomas Murdoch won the resulting by-election on 18 August 1914.
  In October 1914, Hubert Nichols, the member for Mersey, resigned. He was re-elected at the resulting by-election on 7 November 1914.
  On 11 December 1914, Charles Russen, one of the two members for Launceston, died. Tasman Shields won the resulting by-election on 22 January 1915.

Sources
 
 Parliament of Tasmania (2006). The Parliament of Tasmania from 1856

Members of Tasmanian parliaments by term
20th-century Australian politicians